The Baltimore-class heavy cruisers were a large class of heavy cruisers in the United States Navy commissioned during and shortly after World War II. Fourteen Baltimores were completed, more than any other class of heavy cruiser (the British  had 15 vessels planned, but only 13 completed), along with three ships of the  sub-class. The Baltimores also were the first cruisers in the US Navy to be designed without the limitations of the London Naval Treaty.

Fast and heavily armed, the Baltimore cruisers were mainly used in World War II to protect the fast aircraft carriers in battle groups from air attack. Additionally, their  main guns and secondary  guns were regularly used to bombard land targets in support of amphibious landings.  After the war, only six Baltimores (St. Paul, Macon, Toledo, Columbus, Bremerton, and Helena) and two Oregon City-class ships (Albany and Rochester) remained in service, while the rest were moved to the reserve fleet. However, all ships except Boston, Canberra, Chicago and Fall River were reactivated for the Korean War.

Except for St. Paul, all the ships retaining all-gun configurations had very short (18 years or less) service lives, and by 1971 were decommissioned, and started showing up in the scrap-sale lists. However, four Baltimore-class cruisers were refitted and converted into some of the first guided missile cruisers in the world, becoming two of the three  and two  cruisers.  The last of these was decommissioned in 1980, with the Chicago lasting until 1991 in reserve.  No example of the Baltimore class still exists.

History

Planning and construction

Immediately after the outbreak of World War II in September 1939, the US Navy initiated studies regarding a new class of heavy cruiser that led to construction of the Baltimore class. With the start of the war, the limitations instituted by the Second London Naval Treaty, which had completely banned the construction of heavy cruisers, became obsolete. In profile, the Baltimores looked very much like the Cleveland-class light cruisers, the obvious difference being that the larger Baltimores carried nine  guns in three triple turrets, compared to the twelve  guns in four triple turrets of the Clevelands.

The construction of the first four ships of the Baltimore class began on July 1, 1940, and four more were ordered before the year was out. A second order, which consisted of 16 more ships, was approved on August 7, 1942. Despite the heavy losses in cruisers during the first 14 months of the Pacific War, the completion of the ships was delayed, because the Navy gave priority to the construction of the lighter Cleveland-class ships, as more of the lighter ships could be completed more quickly for deployment in carrier groups.  With the construction of the first eight Baltimore-class ships moving slowly, the US Navy used the time to review the initial plans and improve them.  The new, modified design was itself delayed, so that construction had begun on a further six ships—for a total of 14—using the original design before the revisions were completed.  The final three ships ordered were converted to the second design, known as the Oregon City class. Between 1943 and 1947, 17 ships of the Baltimore and Oregon City classes entered service. Construction of the eighteenth ship was suspended, to eventually be completed as a flagship/command ship in 1950. Five more were laid down, but cancelled and scrapped before launch, and one was never started before being cancelled.

The largest contractor for the construction of the Baltimore-class ships was Bethlehem Steel, which produced eight ships at the Fore River Shipyard in Quincy, Massachusetts. New York Shipbuilding in Camden, New Jersey, built four and the Philadelphia Naval Shipyard in Philadelphia completed two. The classification "CA" originally stood for "armored cruiser" but was later used for heavy cruisers.

Service

Of the seventeen (including the three Oregon Citys) completed ships, twelve were commissioned before the Japanese capitulation on September 2, 1945, though only seven took part in the battles of the Pacific Theater and one in the European Theater. By 1947, nine of the Baltimores had been decommissioned and placed in the reserve fleet, while seven (Helena, Toledo, Macon, Columbus, Saint Paul, Rochester, and Albany) remained in service.   However, at the start of the 1950s, six were reactivated (Macon had been decommissioned for four short months: June–October 1950), making thirteen available for deployment in the Korean War.  Six of these were used for escort missions and coastal bombardment in Korea, while the other seven reinforced fleets in other areas of the globe.  Four ships remained out of service: the Fall River was never reactivated, the Boston and Canberra were refitted as Boston-class guided missile cruisers (CGs), and the Chicago was reactivated after being converted to an Albany-class CG.

After the Korean War ended and due to the high cost of keeping them in service; starting in 1954 with Quincy, some of the Baltimores  decommissioned for good. By 1969, six ships were still in commission; five (Boston, Canberra, Chicago, Columbus, Albany) as CGs, and only one unmodified ship, the Saint Paul, which remained active to serve in the Vietnam War, providing gunfire support.  Saint Paul was the only member of the class to serve continuously from commissioning (serving 26 years) and was finally decommissioned in 1971. Boston and Canberra retired in 1970, Columbus (serving 29.5 years) in 1975, and finally Chicago in 1980.  Starting in 1972 all fourteen of the original Baltimores were sold for scrap after being decommissioned, with Chicago being the final one broken up in 1991.

Damage

The ship was hit amidships and both boiler rooms were flooded with 3,000 tons of seawater. She was towed away by sister ship , and as a result both ships missed the crucial Battle of Leyte Gulf. A year later, repairs were completed at the Boston Naval Shipyard and Canberra was assigned to the Atlantic Fleet. In June 1945,  had her entire bow ripped off in a typhoon, but there were no casualties. The ship struggled through  winds to Guam, where provisional repairs were made before sailing to the Puget Sound Naval Shipyard for a full reconstruction. Pittsburghs detached bow stayed afloat, and was later towed into Guam and scrapped.

During the Korean War, a fire in a forward gun turret on 12 April 1952, killed 30 men on St. Paul. Then, in 1953, the same ship was hit by a coastal battery, though without injury to the crew.  Helena in 1951 and Los Angeles in 1953 were also struck by coastal batteries without injuries during the war.

In June 1968, Boston, along with its escort, the Australian destroyer , were victims of friendly fire when planes of the US Air Force mistook them for enemy targets and fired on them with AIM-7 Sparrow missiles. Only Hobart was seriously damaged; although Boston was hit, the warhead of the missile failed to detonate.

Missile conversions

By the latter half of the 1940s, the navy was planning warships equipped with missiles. In 1946 the battleship  and in 1948 the seaplane tender  were converted to test this idea. Both were equipped with, among other weapons, with RIM-2 Terrier missiles, which were also used after 1952 on the first series of operational missile cruisers. These were the first operational guided missile cruisers in the world. They were designated the Boston class and returned to service in 1955 and 1956 respectively, reclassified as CAG-1 and CAG-2—"G" for "guided missile" and maintaining the "A" because they retained their heavy guns.

In the following years six light cruisers of the Cleveland class were equipped with guided missiles and in 1957 the first ship designed from the start to be a missile cruiser was completed. These were recommissioned in 1962 and 1964, respectively. Two more ships were planned to be refitted as Albanys, the Baltimore class  and the Oregon City-class   but these conversions were cancelled because of cost. As opposed to the Boston-class refit, the Albany-class refit required a total reconstruction. Both entire weapons systems and the superstructure were removed and replaced with new ones; the cost of one refit was $175 million. Because no high-caliber guns were retained, the Albany class ships received the designation CG rather than CAG.

Regulus was a nuclear-armed weapon that was primarily used by the US Navy in the nuclear deterrent role. Although associated primarily with submarines, the four Baltimore-class cruisers fitted to operate the missile undertook operational taskings with it to the Western Pacific during the experimental period.

Engineering and equipment

Hull

Since the hull was not altered in either the Albany or the Boston class, these numbers were the same for those ships as well, but the alterations differentiated them in all other categories.

Fully loaded, original Baltimores  displaced  of water. The superstructure occupied about a third of the ship's length and was divided into two deckhouses. The gap between these housed the two thin funnels. Two masts, one a bit forward and the other a bit aft of the funnels, accommodated the positioning electronics.

The Boston class had a draft about  deeper in the water, and displaced about  more water than their former sister ships.  Because the Bostons were only partially refitted, the forward third of the ship remained virtually untouched.  The first serious change was the combination of what were two funnels on the Balitmores to just one, thicker funnel, which still stood in the gap between the two deckhouses.  Because the missiles required more guiding electronic systems, the forward mast was replaced with a four-legged lattice mast with an enlarged platform.  The most conspicuous change was of course the addition of the missile-launching apparatus and its magazine of missiles, which took up the entire back half of the ship and replaced the guns which had been there.

The three Albanys were completely rebuilt from the deck level up; except for the hull they bore very little resemblance to their former sister ships. The deckhouse now took up nearly two thirds of the ship's length and was two decks high for almost the entire length. Above that lay the box-shaped bridge which was one of the most recognizable markers of the class. The two masts and funnels were combined into the so-called "macks, combining "mast" and "stack" (smokestack), where the electronics platforms were attached to the tops of the funnels rather than attached to masts rising all the way from the deck. Such heights could only be achieved with the use of aluminum alloys, which were used to a great extent in the construction of the superstructures.

Propulsion
The Baltimore cruisers were propelled with steam power. Each ship had four shafts, each with a propeller. The Baltimores each had two engine rooms and two funnels, although this was changed in the Bostons, which had only one funnel for all four turbines, as noted above.

The increased displacement of the modified Boston and Albany classes meant their range was reduced to about 9000 and  respectively, despite increases in fuel capacity to 2600 and 2500 tons.

Armament

The main armament of the Baltimore class consisted of three turrets, each with three Mark 15 8"/55 caliber guns (Mark 12 in Baltimore). Two of these were located forward and one aft. They fired a 335-pound (152 kg) shell out to a maximum range of 30,050   yards (27,480 m). The secondary armament consisted of twelve 5"/38 caliber guns in six twin mounts. Two mounts were located on each side of the superstructure and two were behind the main batteries fore and aft. These guns could be used against aircraft and surface targets. In addition, the ships had numerous light anti-aircraft weapons: 12 quadruple mounts of Bofors 40 mm guns (or 11 quadruple mounts and 2 twin mounts on ships with only one rear aircraft crane) as well as 20–28 Oerlikon 20 mm cannon, depending on when a given ship was commissioned. After World War II the 20 mm anti-aircraft guns were removed without replacement, due to limited effectiveness against kamikaze attacks, and because it was expected they would be completely ineffective against postwar aircraft. The 40 mm Bofors were replaced with 3"/50 caliber guns in the 1950s.

Ultimately, though, the deployment of such missiles on surface ships remained an experiment, which was only undertaken until the 1960s. The successor UGM-27 Polaris was carried only by nuclear submarines.

Electronics

Initially, the Baltimores were equipped with SG radar systems for surface targets and SK systems for airborne targets. The radar systems were replaced in the Korean war with the more effective SPS-6 (built by Westinghouse Electric or later with the SPS-12 (from the Radio Corporation of America combined with a SPS-8 as a height-finder. The ships in active service longer received further upgrades in their final years: the SPS-6 was replaced with the SPS-37 (also from Westinghouse) and the SPS-12 was replaced with the SPS-10 from Raytheon.

The Baltimore class was equipped from the start with electronic and electromechanical fire control systems to determine the fire-parameters by which targets over the horizon could be hit.  The main guns were controlled by a Mark 34 fire control system connected to an MK 8 radar. The 5-inch/38 dual purpose guns were guided by two Mk 37 systems with Mk-4 radar.  Later, the fire control radars were replaced along with the main radar systems.  The fire control systems remained the same except that the new 3 in guns were fitted upgraded to Mk 56 with Mk 35 radars.

Aircraft

The onboard flight systems of the Baltimore-class cruisers during World War II consisted of two aircraft catapults on the side edges of the aft deck.  Between the catapults was a sliding hatchway which was the roof of an onboard hangar.  Directly under the hatch was an aircraft elevator.  The hangar had room to accommodate up to four aircraft at one time, one to port forward of the elevator, one to port abeam the elevator,  one starboard abeam, and one on the elevator itself.  The first four ships of the class had two cranes each, while the later models had only one.

At full speed, Vought OS2U Kingfisher could be launched from these catapults and later Curtiss SC-1 Seahawk as well.  These planes were used for reconnaissance, anti-submarine, and rescue missions.  The planes were seaplanes, and after their missions would land in the water near the cruiser and be lifted back up into the ship by the crane or cranes in the rear and reset upon their catapults.  In the 1950s, the catapults and the accompanying capacity to launch airplanes were removed, though the cranes were left and the hangars used to house helicopters, ship's boats or the workings of the Regulus missile system.

Macon in 1948, had a slightly elevated helipad installed instead of the catapults.  Because of the helipad, the available firing angles for the main guns were sharply narrowed and the experiment was therefore quickly abandoned and not attempted on any other ships of the class.  The ships of the Albany class did have an area on the deck for helicopters to land, but no platform.

Later designs
The hull of the Baltimore class was used for the development of a number of other classes.  The Oregon City-class cruisers differed only slightly from Baltimores, because they were originally planned as Baltimore-class cruisers but were constructed based on modified plans.  Though nine ships were planned, only three were completed. The main differences between the two classes is the reduction to a single-trunked funnel, a redesigned forward superstructure that was placed  further aft, primarily to decrease top-heaviness and increase the arcs of fire for the guns. 

Despite having a heavy cruiser hull, she was classed as a light cruiser because her main armament was smaller than 8 inches.

The  was an entirely new heavy cruiser design that attempted to improve upon the Baltimore class.  While the basic deck and machinery layout was largely unchanged, this class carried the first fully automated high-caliber guns on a warship and had improved damage protection features. None was constructed in time to take part in World War II.

The plans for the  light aircraft carrier were adapted from the drafts of the Baltimore hull design, including the layout of the engines.  The hulls of these ships were, however, significantly widened. The Saipan-class ships were completed in 1947 and 1948, but by the mid-1950s, they proved too small for the planes of the jet age and were converted for use as communication and command ships.

Crew

The size of the crew of a Baltimore-class cruiser varied by era and by tactical situation.  Different sources also differ about the numbers. Naturally, the crew sizes were larger during wartime and furthermore, some cruisers—including all three of the modified Albany class—were used as flagships and therefore housed an admiral and his staff.

At launch, during and shortly after the war, the crews consisted of around 60 officers and about 1000 rank and file crewmen. When an admiral's staff was aboard during wartime, this number could swell to 80 officers and 1500 crewmen.  On the Bostons, the standard crew, even in peacetime and without an admiral's staff, was 80 officers and around 1650 crewmen.  Because the Albany class was equipped almost exclusively for guided missiles, it required fewer crew than the Bostons, and was roughly comparable numerically to the basic Baltimore.

Compared to today's crew sizes, these numbers seem high.  The modern  is manned by about 400.  These differences are mostly due to the much less manpower-intensive nature of modern weapon systems.

Ships in class
(Note: the three Oregon City-class ships are not listed here)

See also
List of cruisers of the United States Navy
List of ship classes of the Second World War

Notes

References

External links 

Statistics
Global Security.org - Baltimore class cruiser
Website of a Baltimore Class Cruiser

Cruiser classes